Øygarden is a municipality in Vestland county, Norway. It is an island municipality located in the traditional district of Midhordland, stretching along the west coast of the county. The village of Straume is the administrative centre of the municipality. Other villages in the municipality include Alveim, Blomvåg, Vikavågen, Ågotnes, Fjell, Foldnes, Knappskog, Knarrevik, Kolltveit, Landro, Sekkingstad, Skogsvåg, Klokkarvik, Tælavåg, Kausland, and Hammarsland.

The municipality consists of a chain of islands to the north and west of the city of Bergen. Øygarden is connected to the mainland by a series of bridges and a single road running across the islands. Some of the major islands include Litlesotra, Store Sotra, Bildøy, Bjorøy, Misje, Turøy, Seløyna, Alvøyna, Ona, Blomøyna, Rongøyna, and Toftøyna.

The  municipality is the 260th largest by area out of the 356 municipalities in Norway. Øygarden is the 27th most populous municipality in Norway with a population of 39,032.

General information

The municipality of Øygarden was established on 1 January 1964. It was created by a merger that was set in motion by the Schei Committee. The newly created Øygarden was made up of all of the old municipality of Hjelme (population: 956) and almost all of the municipality of Herdla (population: 2131) that was located west of the Hjeltefjorden (except for the islands of Turøy and Misje which went to the neighboring municipality of Fjell).

On 1 January 2020, the three neighboring municipalities of Fjell, Sund, and Øygarden were merged into one large island municipality called Øygarden.

The administrative centre of Øygarden has changed three times over the years. From 1964 until 2009, it was located at the village of Tjeldstø. From 2009 through 2019, it was located in the village of Rong. In 2020, the administrative centre was moved to the large village of Straume after a large municipal merger.

Name
The name was created in 1964 for the new municipality. The name is the finite form of øygard which means "row (fence) of islands". The first element is øy means "island" and the last element is gard which means "farm".

Coat of arms
The coat of arms were adopted in 2020 and they were based on the arms for the old Sund Municipality which had recently been merged with Øygarden. The arms of Sund were granted on 23 March 1988. They show a blue lighthouse on a white or silver background. This symbolized the importance of the sea and the alertness of the local population. The previous arms were in use from 1966 until 1988 and the new 1988 arms were a simplified version of the old arms. The previous arms were blue with a black and white lighthouse on an island surrounded by waves.

Before 2020, Øygarden had a coat of arms that was granted in 1966, shortly after the establishment of the municipality. The arms showed a black and gray reference sea cairn sitting on an islet on a blue background. The municipality consists of a number of islands and is dependent on the sea for its development. Hence the importance of sea cairns, buoys and lighthouses for safety in the municipality.

Churches
The Church of Norway has four parishes within the municipality of Øygarden. It is part of the Vesthordland prosti (deanery) in the Diocese of Bjørgvin.

Geography
{{Historical populations
|footnote = Source: Statistics Norway.
|shading = off
|1951|1050
|1960|1057
|1970|2835
|1980|2534
|1990|3158
|2000|3623
|2010|4267
|2019|38117
}}
The municipality is made up of many islands. The main islands are (from north to south): Seløyna, Alvøyna, Ona, Blomøyna, Rongøyna, Toftøyna, Misje, Turøyna Sotra, Litlesotra, Geitung, Bildøyna, Bjorøy, Algrøyna, Lokøyna, Syltøyna, Toftøya, Lerøyna, Bjelkarøyna, Tyssøyna, Risøy, Vardøy, Golten, and Viksøy. Besides these larger islands, the municipality consists of hundreds small islands, islets, and reefs. Some of the other islands include Hernar in the far north and Førehjelmo.

The landscape is low and relatively flat. Several smaller lakes are located on the islands. The west side of the islands is an important nesting site for birds. The North Sea lies to the west of the islands and the Hjeltefjorden.

Tjeldstø Marka on Alvøyna has been a protected nature reserve since 1995. It is one of the largest wetland reserves in Hordaland. The Ormhilleren friluftsområde'' is another nature reserve surrounding the Rongesundet strait.

Government
All municipalities in Norway, including Øygarden, are responsible for primary education (through 10th grade), outpatient health services, senior citizen services, unemployment and other social services, zoning, economic development, and municipal roads. The municipality is governed by a municipal council of elected representatives, which in turn elect a mayor.  The municipality falls under the Hordaland District Court and the Gulating Court of Appeal.

Municipal council
The municipal council of Øygarden is made up of 45 representatives that are elected to four year terms. The party breakdown of the council is as follows:

Mayor
The mayors of Øygarden (incomplete list):
2019–present: Tom Georg Indrevik (H)
2015-2019: Børge Haugetun (LL)
2015-2015: Åse Gunn Husebø (Ap)
2011-2014: Otto Harkestad (Ap)
2000-2011: Olav Martin Vik (LL)
1995-1999: Rolv Svein Rougnø  (H)
1990-1995: Otto Harkestad (Ap)

Economy
The municipality has a significant aquaculture industry, primarily with salmon, cod, and shellfish. Agriculture is limited in the municipality and is largely a part-time occupation, with most farmers have another profession too. The type of agriculture in Øygarden is dominated by raising livestock (sheep, cattle, and chickens).

Since 1988, petroleum activities have become a major industry in Øygarden. The transportation of oil from the Oseberg oil field through a pipeline to Sture on Alvøyna was the start of the oil boom. In 1996, a natural gas processing plant at Kollsnes on the island of Ona was completed.

Notable residents
 Martin Rasmussen Hjelmen (1904 in Øygarden – 1944), a Norwegian sailor and communist activist
 John Alvheim (1930 in Øygarden – 2005) nurse anaesthetist, aid worker and politician
 Lars Arne Nilsen (born 1964 in Sotra) a Norwegian football manager
 Alexander Dale Oen (1985 in Øygarden – 2012) swimmer on the Norwegian national team, silver medallist at the 2008 Summer Olympics

Gallery

References

External links

Municipal fact sheet from Statistics Norway 

 
Municipalities of Vestland
1964 establishments in Norway
Archipelagoes of Norway
Landforms of Vestland